Georges Mvoue (born 18 October 1988) is a Cameroonian professional footballer who plays for Vataniakos F.C. in the Football League (Greece).

References

External links 
 Profile

1988 births
Living people
Cameroonian footballers
Cameroonian expatriate footballers
Association football forwards
Vataniakos F.C. players